Abhilasha Gupta Nandi is a politician from Prayagraj, Uttar Pradesh, India. She is present mayor of the Allahabad Municipal Corporation.

She was elected mayor on 7 July 2012, becoming the youngest person to have been elected to the post. In the 2012 Mayoral election, she defeated her nearest rival Kamla Singh of the BJP by a comprehensive margin of more than 69,000 votes. She is married to Nand Gopal Nandi.

She was arrested on 14 February 2014 in a case related to the alleged violation of the model code of conduct in 2012 civic body polls. Abhilasha and her husband Nand Gopal Nandi who was affiliated with Bahujan Samaj Party, have been expelled from the party for their alleged anti-party activities in a case related to the alleged violation of the model code of conduct in 2012 civic body polls in March, 2014.

She joined the BJP in January, 2017, along with her husband Nand Gopal Nandi.

Gupta comfortably defended her post in the Mayoral elections of 2017, defeating her nearest rival, Samajwadi Party's Vinod Dubey, by more than 63,000 votes.

References 

Living people
Bharatiya Janata Party politicians from Uttar Pradesh
Bahujan Samaj Party politicians from Uttar Pradesh
Women mayors of places in Uttar Pradesh
Politicians from Allahabad
Women in Uttar Pradesh politics
Year of birth missing (living people)
Mayors of Allahabad
20th-century Indian women politicians
21st-century Indian women politicians
20th-century Indian politicians
21st-century Indian politicians